Maurus vogelii or Vogel's blue is a species of butterfly in the family Lycaenidae. It is the sole representative of the monotypic genus Maurus.

References

Polyommatini